Great House Farm, or The Great House, Llangua, Monmouthshire is a farmhouse dating from the 17th century. The house is listed at Grade II*. The barn and cider and cow houses in the farmyard have their own Grade II listings.

History and description
The farmhouse dates from the mid-17th century and was altered, internally and externally, in the 19th century. The barn is 18th century in date, and the cider house also dates from this period, although it was originally a cow barn and was converted into a cider house in the 19th century.

The farmhouse is constructed of local rubble, which has been rendered. The "unusually well-preserved interior" contains plasterwork dating from the time of the original construction. The farmhouse is Grade II* listed, with the barn and cider house having their own Grade II listings.

Notes

Grade II* listed buildings in Monmouthshire
Grade II* listed houses